Aït Bouaddou, also called Ath Vouvaddou or Beni Bouaddou, is a commune in the Ouadhia District of Tizi Ouzou Province in the Kabylie region of Algeria.

Geography 

Located near the mountains of Djurdjura, the town has  eight villages and about  inhabitants.
 Aït Djemaa, administrative centre
 Aït Maalem,
 Ibadissen,
 Aït Amar,
 Aït Ouel hadj
 Aït Irane, altitude 813 meters
 Aït Khalfa
 Takherradjit

Localisation

Aït Bouaddou is in the Tizi Ouzou Wilaya southern and is bordered by :

 East : Agouni Gueghrane.
 West : Ath Boughardane (Assi Youcef).
 South : Djurdjura Range.
 North : Tizi N'Tleta.

See also

Communes of Algeria
Villages of Aït Bouaddou

References

Communes of Tizi Ouzou Province